Matthew Allwright (born 14 April 1970) is an English television presenter, journalist, and musician. He has presented shows such as Watchdog, Rogue Traders, Food Inspectors, The Code, Fake Britain and The One Show for BBC One.

Early life
Allwright was educated at two independent schools in Berkshire: Dolphin School in Hurst (near Reading), and Reading Blue Coat School in Sonning, where he was Head Boy; followed by the University of Manchester, where he gained a degree in English.

Career
In 1997, while working as a producer on BBC Radio Solent, Allwright was commissioned to report on his mother’s issue with Bounce tumble dryer sheets. He negotiated with Watchdog, and fronted the piece himself after contacting the programme.  The BBC saw potential and requested Allwright present the report himself. This led to a regular reporting slot on the show. Many of his early Watchdog stints also guest-starred his mother, as a consumer commentator.

In 2001, Allwright also began presenting another programme, Rogue Traders with Dan Penteado. The show was a 30-minute undercover consumer programme in which Allwright and Penteado investigated and confronted rogue tradesmen. In 2004, Allwright hosted Brassed Off Britain, Scambusters and Fat Nation for the BBC. In 2007, he also presented Food Poker for BBC Two. In 2008, Allwright and former Watchdog presenter Anita Rani hosted a short-lived spin-off from Rogue Traders, called Rogue Restaurants. In 2009, Rogue Traders was merged with Watchdog, with Rogue Traders split into feature segments and shown throughout. Allwright also became co-host on Watchdog.

Since 2010, Allwright has guest hosted BBC One's The One Show, where he fills in for Matt Baker on numerous occasions, as well as being a regular feature reporter. Since 2011, Allwright has also hosted the BBC show You've Been Scammed. In 2012, Allwright presented ITV's primetime game show The Exit List for one series. Allwright also co-hosting the BBC One programme Food Inspectors with Chris Hollins. In 2012, Rogue Traders co-presenter Dan Penteado was dropped by the BBC following his arrest for fraud. Allwright continued to present the show, in a solo capacity.

From 2013, Allwright replaced Dominic Littlewood in presenting BBC consumer rights programmes Fake Britain and Saints and Scroungers, in 2017 Dominic Littlewood returned to presenting duties on Fake Britain and Allwright left the series. In December 2013, Allwright began co-presenting the BBC One programme Keeping Britain Safe 24/7 with Julia Bradbury.

From 1 September 2014, Allwright presented The Housing Enforcers, a daytime programme for BBC One. There were ten 45-minute episodes showing each week day for a run of two weeks. A second series was shown on the BBC in 2015 of which there were twenty 45-minute episodes. In April 2016, Allwright began presenting the BBC One daytime game show The Code which returned for a second series in March 2017.

On 4 June 2016, Allwright guest presented an episode of The Saturday Show on Channel 5 alongside Gaby Roslin. The following month he became a permanent co-presenter after Matt Barbet left the show, but the series was still cancelled in October 2016.

Personal life
Allwright is a patron of the Stillbirth and Neonatal Death Society (SANDS). He is also a patron of Launchpad Reading, a local charity working to prevent homelessness in Reading, and the Dorset-based Grace Secondary School Appeal. Allwright is a follower of cricket and a supporter of Bracknell Bees ice hockey club and Liverpool Football Club.

Allwright is an aficionado of country music and plays guitar, lap and pedal steel guitars, keyboards, and sings. He writes a regular blog about his experiences learning to play the pedal steel guitar.

Matt is married, has two children and has a miniature schnauzer called Enzo.

Filmography
Television

Guest appearances 
The Wright Stuff (2006)
Pointless Celebrities (26 May 2012, 28 May 2016)
Hacker Time (30 July 2013)
Holiday of My Lifetime (3 November 2014)
The Saturday Show (23 April 2016)
The Chase: Celebrity Special (30 October 2016)
Debatable (4 & 5 May 2017)
Richard Osman's House of Games (3-8 December 2018)

References

External links
Official website
Rogue Traders website
 Matt Allwright at the British Film Institute

Living people
English television presenters
English male journalists
People educated at Reading Blue Coat School
1970 births
People from Wokingham